31 Service Battalion is a combat service support unit of The Canadian Army Reserve. The unit was formed in 2010 when 21 (Windsor) Service Battalion, 22 (London) Service Battalion, 23 (Hamilton) Service Battalion and elements of Area Support Unit London were merged into one formation.

Unit history 
The unit's predecessor was Hamilton Service Battalion, formed on 1 January 1965. The new battalion was made up of four units, 133 Company Royal Canadian Army Service Corps (RCASC), 16 Medical Company Royal Canadian Army Medical Corps (RCAMC), 5 Technical Regiment Royal Canadian Electrical Mechanical Engineers (RCEME), 4 Ordnance Company Royal Canadian Ordnance Corps (RCOC), a platoon of Military Police and members of the Canadian Women's Army Corps. The unit became part of the Hamilton Militia District.

In 1975 all service battalions were numbered and the Hamilton Service Battalion became 23 (Hamilton) Service Battalion. In 1976 the Medical Company became an independent unit known as 23 Medical Company, Canadian Forces Medical Services. With the closing of the Militia Districts and the formation of the Brigade system, 23 Service Battalion became part of 31 Canadian Brigade Group headquartered in London, Ontario.

Members of the battalion have served with NATO on Reforger Exercises in West Germany and in Norway, and with distinction on peacekeeping missions with the United Nations, NATO and multi-national forces, in Egypt, Cyprus, Golan Heights, Namibia, Cambodia, Somalia, Bosnia, Kosovo, Rwanda and Afghanistan. Unit members have also served on domestic operations during the Olympic Games in Canada, the blizzard of 1977 in the Niagara region, the Manitoba floods of 1997 and the ice storms of 1998 in eastern Ontario.

On 3 November 2001, the battalion (in its former designation as 23 Service Battalion) was granted Freedom of the City of Hamilton by Mayor Bob Wade.

31 Service Battalion is affiliated with the British Army's 158 Regiment RLC (formerly of the Royal Anglian Regiment). The units used to exchange annual training exercises where members of 158 Regiment undergo winter warfare training at 4th Canadian Division Training Centre Meaford, Ontario and 31 Service Battalion members would attend a fall exercise in England.

References

External links
31 Service Battalion official website

Battalions of the Canadian Army
Army logistics units and formations of Canada
Military units and formations established in 2010